The men's 200 metres event at the 1989 Summer Universiade was held at the Wedaustadion in Duisburg with the final on 27 and 28 August 1989.

Medalists

Results

Heats
Wind:Heat 1: +1.6 m/s, Heat 2: +1.1 m/s, Heat 3: +1.1 m/s, Heat 4: +2.8 m/s, Heat 5: +1.5 m/s, Heat 6: +3.2 m/s, Heat 7: +2.2 m/s, Heat 8: +0.7 m/s

Quarterfinals
Wind:Heat 1: +1.2 m/s, Heat 2: +0.9 m/s, Heat 3: +1.6 m/s, Heat 4: +0.8 m/s

Semifinals
Wind:Heat 1: +1.3 m/s, Heat 2: +1.9 m/s

Final

Wind: +3.4 m/s

References

Athletics at the 1989 Summer Universiade
1989